Pragun Akhil Jindal (born 13 September 1996) is an Indian author, speaker and entrepreneur. He is noted for his work in Black Money and in the Finance field.

Pragun has been writing since the age of 16 and has presented papers, articles and solutions in various fields like Black Money, Curbing Tax Evasion,  and Financial Literacy in the youth .

Jindal authored The Black White & Grey : Recoloring The Rupiah, which was published by Money Worries the Publishing arm of  JER Limited. in August 2016. The book was listed in the top #5 books on Amazon in the Public Administration & Finance categories for close to 2 months after publication.

Jindal is a contributor in The Smart Artist a production by Artbuzz Studios which is a guide for creative professionals.

He is one of the new age authors on Black Money in the Indian Economic Dispora.

Jindal is the co-founder of Rupyo (one of India’s first Earned Wage Access Application)

The Black White & Grey  
The Black White & Grey: Recoloring The Rupiah was e-launched by Honourable HRD Minister Prakash Javadekar.

The book, titled 'The Black White & Grey - Re-Coloring The Rupiah', authored by Pragun Jindal and published by Money Worries, looks at the black money menace and ways to curb it.

In this book, the author unfolds this dark world, which eats into an idea of an equal world where the rich get richer staying on the dark side while the poor are marginalized. There are tricks to keep the cover of darkness intact and every time an effort is made to lift the veil, the tricks become sharper.

This book looks at the world that thrives in the shadows, fueled by money that exchanges hands in the dark and never gets reported – "The Kala Dhan."

Senior Congress Leader Manish Tewari, Former Central Board of Direct Taxes Chief Sudhir Chandra and political commentator Paranjoy Guha Thakurta on 13.12.2016 formally launched the book which attempts to debunk "a lot of lies, unknown facts and baseless rumours about Black Money". "A delinquent like poverty only affects the poor, unemployment affects those who are unemployed, alcoholism and drug abuse affect those who devour them, black money is a hitch which does not affect persons who amass 'black dough' but it affects the common man in the populace," said the author at the launch event held at India Habitat Centre in New Delhi.

The Smart Artist 
The Smart Artist is an Artbuzz Studios production and publication launched along- side the India Art Fair 202 to promote the Art-preneurs in India.

The book aims at assisting 'Artrepreneurs' build a career as a holistic artist, guiding them through expert eyes of industry professionals and perspectives of experts. This book is a product of research that will help creative professionals to establish themselves in a more organized and informed fashion as it’s never too late to be a smarter artist!

Pragun is a contributor in the book and deals with financial aspects in Art & Artists.

Personal life 
Jindal stays in New Delhi along with his parents and grandparents. He completed his schooling from the prestigious Shri Ram School in New Delhi.

Jindal graduated from the University Of Delhi with a first class degree in Bachelor Of Commerce Gt (Honours) and LLB. He was conferred with a LL.M in International and Commercial Trade from the University of Buckingham. He also majored in Finance, Tax and Accountancy.

Awards and recognition 

 Jindal was the keynote speaker at the Times Nie Newsmakers Meet held at Manav Rachna University in 2017.
 Jindal has been invited to various platforms to portray his views on demonetisation and black money.

References

1996 births
Living people
Writers from Delhi
Delhi University alumni
Indian non-fiction writers